Rachel Catherine Trenaman (born 18 April 2001) is an Australian cricketer who plays as a right-handed batter and occasional right-arm leg break bowler. She plays for Tasmania in the Women's National Cricket League and the Hobart Hurricanes in the Women's Big Bash League.

She made her New South Wales debut as a 15-year-old in late 2016 and was added to the Sydney Thunder squad for WBBL03.  In early 2018, aged 16, she was appointed captain of Australia's 50-over side for an under-19 tour of South Africa, during which she made scores of 122 and 91, and took three wickets.

In November 2018, she was named in Sydney Thunder's squad for the 2018–19 Women's Big Bash League season. In April 2019, Cricket Australia awarded her with a contract with the National Performance Squad ahead of the 2019–20 season. She joined Tasmania ahead of the 2022–23 Women's National Cricket League season.

References

External links

Rachel Trenaman at Cricket Australia

2001 births
Living people
Cricketers from New South Wales
Australian women cricketers
Hobart Hurricanes (WBBL) cricketers
New South Wales Breakers cricketers
Sydney Thunder (WBBL) cricketers
Tasmanian Tigers (women's cricket) cricketers